P700, or photosystem I primary donor, is the reaction-center chlorophyll a molecular dimer associated with photosystem I in plants, algae, and cyanobacteria.

Etymology 
Its name is derived from the word “pigment” (P) and the presence of a major bleaching band centered around 695-700 nm in the flash-induced absorbance difference spectra of P700/ P700+•.

Components 
The structure of P700 consists of a heterodimer with two distinct chlorophyll molecules, most notably chlorophyll a and chlorophyll a’, giving it an additional name of “special pair”. Inevitably, however, the special pair of P700 behaves as if it were just one unit. This species is vital due to its ability to absorb light energy with a wavelength approximately between 430 nm-700 nm, and transfer high-energy electrons to a series of acceptors that are situated near it.

Action and functions 
Photosystem I operates with the functions of producing NADPH, the reduced form of NADP, at the end of the photosynthetic reaction through electron transfer, and of providing energy to a proton pump and eventually ATP, for instance in cyclic electron transport.

Excitation 
When photosystem I absorbs light, an electron is excited to a higher energy level in the P700 chlorophyll. The resulting P700 with an excited electron is designated as P700*, which is a strong reducing agent due to its very negative redox potential of -1.2 V.

Electron transport chain 
Following the excitation of P700, one of its electrons is passed on to an electron acceptor, A, triggering charge separation producing an anionic A and cationic P700. Subsequently, electron transfer continues from A to a phylloquinone molecule known as A, and then to three iron-sulfur clusters.

Type I photosystems use iron-sulfur cluster proteins as terminal electron acceptors. Thus, the electron is transferred from F to another iron sulfur cluster, F, and then passed on to the last iron-sulfur cluster serving as an electron acceptor, F. Eventually, the electron is transferred to the protein ferredoxin, causing it to transform into its reduced form, which subsequently finalizes the process by reducing NADP to NADPH.

Linear electron transport 
The rate of electrons being passed from P700* to the subsequent electron acceptors is high, preventing the electron from being transferred back to P700. Consequently, in most cases, the electrons transferring within photosystem I follow a linear pathway, from the excitation of the P700 special pair to the production of NADPH.

Cyclic electron transport 
In certain situations, it is vital for the photosynthetic organism to recycle the electrons being transferred, resulting in the electron from the terminal iron-sulfur cluster F transferring back to the cytochrome b6f complex (adaptor between photosystems II and I). Utilizing the energy of P700, the cyclic pathway creates a proton gradient useful for the production of ATP, while no NADPH is produced, since the protein ferredoxin does not become reduced.

Recovery of P700 
P700 recovers its lost electron by oxidizing plastocyanin, which regenerates P700.

See also 
 P680
 Photosystem I
 Photosystem II

References 

Photosynthesis
Light reactions